Floating is a bartending technique where a liquor or ingredient is layered at the top of a drink. The cocktails or shots produced with this technique are known as either a Pousse-café or a layered drink.  Although the amount of alcohol used in a float is only about half an ounce, it enhances the tone flavor of the drink at hand.

Physical principle 
Floating liqueurs is based on buoyancy. Anything less dense than a fluid floats on top of that fluid. This holds for solids, like a piece of wood on top of water, as well as for other liquids, like of oil on top of water. Oil and water do not mix, but it also happens for fluids that do mix. Any two liquids which have a different density can be floated on top of each other. The buoyancy force prevents the fluids from mixing immediately, although the fluids do mix eventually over time, if they mix at all. To prevent the fluids from mixing through turbulence, it is important to pour them very slowly during layering.

Barkeepers often do not talk about density, but call fluids 'lighter' and 'heavier' or refer to 'specific gravity', which means the same. If two identical volumes of fluids are compared, the denser one weighs more than the lighter one.

Floating Liqueurs in practice 
Floating only works if the denser liquor is poured into the glass first. If the lighter one is poured in first, the denser one falls through to the bottom of the glass, which creates a lot of unwanted turbulence. Densities of common cocktail ingredients can be looked up online, or one uses the following rule of thumb. Sweet liqueurs with low proof are the heaviest, and dry liqueurs with high proof the lightest.

Notes

References

Bartending